Meade National Forest was established in Maryland by the U.S. Forest Service on April 10, 1925 with  from part of the Camp Meade Military Reservation. On December 2, 1927 the executive order for its creation was rescinded and the forest was abolished.

References

External links
Forest History Society
Forest History Society:Listing of the National Forests of the United States Text from Davis, Richard C., ed. Encyclopedia of American Forest and Conservation History. New York: Macmillan Publishing Company for the Forest History Society, 1983. Vol. II, pp. 743-788.

Former National Forests that were military bases
Former National Forests of Maryland
Protected areas established in 1925
1925 establishments in Maryland
1927 disestablishments in Maryland